is a railway station on the Joban Line in the city of  Iwaki, Fukushima Prefecture, Japan, operated by East Japan Railway Company (JR East).

Lines

Station layout
Ueda Station has two opposed side platforms connected to the station building by a footbridge. The station is staffed.

Platforms

History
Ueda Station was opened on 25 February 1897. The station was absorbed into the JR East network upon the privatization of the Japanese National Railways (JNR) on 1 April 1987.

Passenger statistics
In fiscal 2018, the station was used by an average of 1852 passengers daily (boarding passengers only).

Surrounding area
Ueki Post Office

See also
 List of railway stations in Japan

External links

References

Stations of East Japan Railway Company
Railway stations in Fukushima Prefecture
Jōban Line
Railway stations in Japan opened in 1897
Iwaki, Fukushima